John Munnelly (died 18 October 1941) was an Irish Fianna Fáil politician. A farmer, he was a county councillor before being elected, on his fourth attempt, to Dáil Éireann as a Fianna Fáil Teachta Dála (TD) for the Mayo North constituency at the 1937 general election. He was re-elected at the 1938 general election. He died in office in October 1941 but no by-election was held for his seat.

References

Year of birth missing
1941 deaths
Fianna Fáil politicians
Members of the 9th Dáil
Members of the 10th Dáil
Politicians from County Mayo
Irish farmers